This provides a summary of the results of elections to the United States House of Representatives from the elections held in 1856 to the present. This time period corresponds to the Third, Fourth, Fifth and Sixth Party Systems of the United States. For the purposes of counting partisan divisions in the U.S. House of Representatives, "Independent Democrats", "Independent Republicans", and other members loosely affiliated with the two main parties have been included in the "Democrat" and "Republican" member tallies in the table below, though the details of such are included in the accompanying 'Notes'. Parties with a majority, or which controlled the U.S. House of Representatives after the election, are shown in bold.


See also
 List of United States House of Representatives elections (1789–1822)
 List of United States House of Representatives elections (1824–1854)
 Third Party System
 Fourth Party System
 Fifth Party System
 Sixth Party System

Notes

References

Bibliography

External links
 History, Art & Archives United States House of Representatives

1856-present
House of Representatives elections, 1856-present